Las Tablas is an unincorporated community located in Rio Arriba County, New Mexico, United States. Las Tablas had its own post office until July 29, 1995.

References

Unincorporated communities in Rio Arriba County, New Mexico
Unincorporated communities in New Mexico